Cianan Fahy (born 1998) is an Irish hurler who plays for Galway Senior Championship club Ardrahan and at inter-county level with the Galway senior hurling team. He has lined out as a defender and as a forward.

Career

Fahy first played hurling as a schoolboy with the Gort Community School, with whom he lined out in the Connacht Colleges Championship. He simultaneously lined out with the Ardrahan club at juvenile and underage levels before eventually progressing onto the senior team. Fahy first appeared on the inter-county scene as a member of the Galway minor hurling team that beat Tipperary in the 2015 All-Ireland minor hurling final. He later won a Leinster U21 Championship title. Fahy was drafted onto the Galway senior hurling team in 2022.

Career statistics

Honours

Galway
Leinster Under-21 Hurling Championship: 2018
All-Ireland Minor Hurling Championship: 2015

References

1998 births
Living people
Ardrahan hurlers
Galway inter-county hurlers